Václav Brandejs (born 13 May 1946) is a Czech former sailor. He competed in the Flying Dutchman event at the 1980 Summer Olympics with his brother Ivan.

References

External links
 

1946 births
Living people
Czech male sailors (sport)
Olympic sailors of Czechoslovakia
Sailors at the 1980 Summer Olympics – Flying Dutchman
People from Hronov
Sportspeople from the Hradec Králové Region